Astray may refer to:

Literature
 Astray, a 2012 short story collection by Emma Donoghue

Music
 Astray, an 1898 composition by Jean Sibelius
 Astray, a 1983 composition by Horațiu Rădulescu
 Astray (album), by Samiam, 2000
 "Astray", a song by I Am Kloot from the 2005 album Gods and Monsters (album) 
 "Astray", a song by Mark McGuire from the 2014 album Along the Way
 "Astray", a song by Theatre of Tragedy from the 2009 album Forever Is the World

See also
 
 Ashtray
 Stray (disambiguation)